Obrad Bejatović (born August 21, 2003) is a Canadian soccer player who plays as a goalkeeper for FK Leotar in the Premier League of Bosnia and Herzegovina.

Early life 
Bejatović played youth soccer in Canada with the Burlington Force Soccer Academy and Hamilton United.

In 2021, he began attending Ryerson University, where he played for the men's soccer team, but did not make any appearances.

Club career 
In 2021, Bejatovic played with the Serbian White Eagles in the Canadian Soccer League.

In 2022, he played for Hamilton United in League1 Ontario.

In 2022, he signed with Bosnian club Hercegovac in the Second League of the Republika Srpska. He made his debut on September 11, 2022 against FK Rudar Ugljevik.

In January 2023, he signed with Premier League of Bosnia and Herzegovina club Leotar, after having trained with the club the previous season.

References

External links
Obrad Bejatović at Football Association of Republika Srpska

2003 births
Living people
Serbian White Eagles FC players
Canadian people of Serbian descent
League1 Ontario players
Canadian Soccer League (1998–present) players
FK Leotar players
Association football goalkeepers